Eduardo Armella (20 June 1928 – 14 January 2011) was an Argentine sports shooter. He competed in the 50 metre rifle, three positions event at the 1964 Summer Olympics.

References

External links
 

1928 births
2011 deaths
Argentine male sport shooters
Olympic shooters of Argentina
Shooters at the 1964 Summer Olympics
Place of birth missing
Sportspeople from Jujuy Province